Michael McCarty (September 7, 1946 - September 26, 2014) was an American movie, television, and stage actor. He was known for his roles in Casper (1995), Dead Man (1995), and in The Legend of Bagger Vance (2000). He was born in Evansville, Indiana.

McCarty died in Santa Barbara, California from heart failure after traveling there for a stage production. He was 68 years old.

Filmography

References

Other websites
 

1946 births
2014 deaths
Male actors from Indiana
American male film actors
American male stage actors
American male television actors
The Holy Modal Rounders members